Joshua Baden Teague is an Australian politician. He has been a Liberal member of the South Australian House of Assembly since the 2018 state election, representing Heysen.

On 8 September 2020, he was elected as Speaker of the South Australian House of Assembly. He left the role on 12 October 2021 following a motion of no confidence moved in the chair, enabling his former Liberal Party colleague turned independent, Dan Cregan to ascend to the speakership. In November 2021, he was appointed as Minister for Planning and Local Government, with the Attorney-General role intended to be acting only. He held these portfolios until his party lost the election at the 2022 state election.

Teague, a lawyer, is the son of former senator Baden Teague.

References

Year of birth missing (living people)
Living people
Members of the South Australian House of Assembly
Speakers of the South Australian House of Assembly
Liberal Party of Australia members of the Parliament of South Australia
21st-century Australian politicians